Choczewko  (formerly , (1938-45): Goten) is a village in the administrative district of Gmina Choczewo, within Wejherowo County, Pomeranian Voivodeship, in northern Poland.

References

See also
 History of Pomerania

Choczewko